The Castle of Arta is a medieval fortification in the city of Arta in western Greece.

History
The Castle of Arta lies at the northeasterrn edge of the city, at the bend of the Arachthos River.  Remains of ancient ashlars on the eastern wall of the castle testify that it was built on the site of the lower town of ancient Ambracia, which had been abandoned since the foundation of nearby Nicopolis in 31 BC. It is unclear when exactly the site of Arta was reoccupied; it is first documented during a Norman siege in 1082, by which time it apparently had some fortifications.

The castle was the citadel of the city, and is attributed to the early 13th-century rulers of the Despotate of Epirus of which Arta was the capital, but its current form dates mostly from Ottoman times. The castle was most likely built under Michael II Komnenos Doukas, the third ruler of Epirus: a monogram attributed to him has been found in a tower close to the main gate. As the capital of the Epirote principality, Arta was often besieged by the Byzantine Empire on the one hand and the Angevins of the Kingdom of Naples on the other. The Byzantines took the city in 1338/39, but it soon fell to the Serbian Empire, before Nikephoros II Orsini restored the Epirote state in 1356/57. The Serbian ruler Simeon Urosh ruled the city after 1359, until it fell to the Albanian Peter Losha, who established the Despotate of Arta. The city remained in Albanian hands until 1416 when, after a long siege, it the city fell to Carlo I Tocco, who thus re-established the Epirote state under his rule.

In 1449, Arta was conquered by the Ottoman Empire, who ruled it until 1717, with the exception of a Venetian occupation during the Morean War (1684–1699). From 1717 it was a mainland dependency of the Venetian Ionian Islands, until the Fall of the Republic of Venice in 1797, when it came under French control, only to be conquered by Ali Pasha of Janina two years later. It then remained part of the Ottoman Empire until the annexation of Arta into the Kingdom of Greece in 1881.

Description
On the eastern side, once protected by the river, there is a single wall that incorporates part of the ancient city wall of Ambracia. The inner wall survives intact to the present day, but the outer wall only in isolated stretches. The walls have been reinforced with many bastions, and the towers and parapets modified to hold artillery embrasures by the Ottomans and Venetians. 

Remains of a Byzantine-era church and building suggest that these may have been the palace and palace church of the Despots of Epirus. Almost all archaeological remains in the interior of the castle have been wiped out, however, by the construction of a Xenia hotel in the 1960s.

References

Sources

 
 
 

Despotate of Epirus
Byzantine castles in Epirus (region)
Buildings and structures in Arta, Greece
13th-century fortifications in Greece